The 2006 UEFA Intertoto Cup was the first edition after a major change of the competition format. There were only three rounds instead of five, and eleven tournament co-winners qualified for the second qualifying round of the UEFA Cup (instead of three teams qualifying for the first round proper). Also, for the first time in the modern history of the competition, an outright winner was highlighted from the 11 co-winners of the Cup, with that honour going to the final-round Intertoto winner that advanced farthest in the UEFA Cup. This honour went to Newcastle United.

First round

|-
!colspan="5"|Southern-Mediterranean region
|-

|-
!colspan="5"|Central-East region
|-

|-
!colspan="5"|Northern region
|-

First leg

Second leg

Farul Constanţa won 4–2 on aggregate.

Maribor won 8–0 on aggregate.

Ethnikos Achna FC won 5–4 on aggregate.

NK Zrinjski won 4–1 on aggregate.

Dinamo Tbilisi won 8–1 on aggregate.

MTZ-RIPO Minsk won 6–4 on aggregate.

Nitra won 12–2 on aggregate.

Tiraspol won 2–1 on aggregate.

Keflavík won 4–1 on aggregate.

Dinaburg won 2–1 on aggregate.

Tampere United won 8–1 on aggregate.

Kalmar FF won 8–1 on aggregate.

Shelbourne won 5–0 on aggregate.

Second round

|-
!colspan="5"|Southern-Mediterranean region
|-

|-
!colspan="5"|Central-East region
|-

|-
!colspan="5"|Northern region
|-

* FK Zeta qualified for this season's UEFA competitions as member of the Football Association of Serbia and Montenegro during the 2005/06 season but was at the time of that match already a member of the Football Association of Montenegro.

First leg

1The match was played at FK Partizan's ground in Belgrade, Serbia, because FK Zeta's ground in Golubovci doesn't meet UEFA standards
2The match was played in Herzliya because Maccabi Petah Tikva's ground in Petah Tikva is undergoing renovations

Second leg

Kayserispor won 4–3 on aggregate.

Farul Constanţa won 3–2 on aggregate.

Maribor won 4–1 on aggregate.

Maccabi Petah Tikva won 4–2 on aggregate.

2–2 on aggregate, Ethnikos Achna won on away goals rule.

Grasshoppers won 4–0 on aggregate.

Dnipro Dnipropetrovsk won 3–2 on aggregate.

SV Ried won 4–1 on aggregate.

Tiraspol won 4–1 on aggregate.

FC Moscow won 3–0 on aggregate.

Kalmar FF won 5–3 on aggregate.

OB won 3–1 on aggregate.

Lillestrøm won 6–3 on aggregate.

Hibernian won 8–0 on aggregate.

Third round
The eleven winning teams qualified for the second qualifying round of the 2006–07 UEFA Cup.

|-
!colspan="5"|Southern-Mediterranean region
|-

|-
!colspan="5"|Central-East region
|-

|-
!colspan="5"|Northern region
|-

^played on 16 July

*After consultations with UEFA, Italian qualifier Palermo was withdrawn by the Italian Football Federation (FIGC) on 6 June 2006. Due to the ongoing match-fixing scandal in Italy, the FIGC could not officially confirm the 2005–06 Serie A standings in time for Palermo to compete in the Intertoto Cup and therefore French club Auxerre replaced Palermo, according to UEFA regulations governing the Intertoto Cup.

First leg

Second leg

AJ Auxerre won 4–2 on aggregate.

Kayserispor won 2–0 on aggregate.

Maribor won 3–2 on aggregate.

Ethnikos Achna won 4–3 on aggregate.

Grasshoppers won 3–2 on aggregate.

2–2 on aggregate, Marseille won on away goals rule.

Hertha BSC won 2–0 on aggregate.

SV Ried won 4–2 on aggregate.

Newcastle United won 4–1 on aggregate.

Twente won 3–2 on aggregate.

2–2 on aggregate, OB won on away goals rule.

Overall winners
Eight of the eleven co-winners which entered the UEFA Cup via the Intertoto Cup won their qualifying ties and progressed to the first round proper. Half of these eight survived the first round and entered the group stages, only Newcastle United secured a place in the UEFA Cup Round of 32 and were the last remaining team from the Intertoto Cup – making them the outright winner. They then went on to qualify for the last 16. Captain Scott Parker was presented with a certificate commemorating the triumph at St James Park before their tie with AZ.

  Newcastle United (Overall winners) (round of 16, lost to AZ)
  Auxerre (Group stage, fourth in Group A)
  Grasshopper Zürich (Group stage, fifth in Group C)
  Odense (Group stage, fourth in Group D)
  Marseille (First round, lost to Mladá Boleslav)
  Hertha Berlin (First round, lost to Odense)
  Kayserispor (First round, lost to AZ)
  Ethnikos Achna (First round, lost to Lens)
  Twente (Second qualifying round, lost to Levadia Tallinn)
  Ried (Second qualifying round, lost to Sion)
  Maribor (Second qualifying round, lost to Partizan)

See also
2006–07 UEFA Champions League
2006–07 UEFA Cup

Notes and references

External links

 Official UEFA site
 Uefa Regions
 UI cup official rules & regulations

UEFA Intertoto Cup
3